The Nuxalk Nation is the band government of the Nuxalk people of Bella Coola, British Columbia. It is a member of the Wuikinuxv-Kitasoo-Nuxalk Tribal Council, and until March 2008 was a member of the Unrepresented Nations and Peoples Organization. The population is 1,479.

Etymology 
"Nuxalk" is singular; "Nuxalkmc" is plural.

Community 
Q'umk'uts', a Nuxalk community that is located at the confluence of the Bella Coola River and the Pacific Ocean  is currently home to the majority of the Nuxalk population, is located in the Bella Coola Valley, in British Columbia. It is on the Nation's primary reserve (which is much smaller than the Nation's traditional territory), adjacent to the Bella Coola "townsite", the Central business district for the Valley. Nuxalk Hall is a community center, where potlatches and social events are held. The Nuxalk Basketball Association hosts games in the hall.

The Nuxalkmc were wrongfully categorized as Coast Salish. Today the Nuxalkmc are classified under their own distinct category.

Language 
The Nuxalk Nation traditionally has spoken the Nuxalk language. Today there are an estimated 5 fluent speakers, 80 conversational speakers, and 140 learning speakers. Nuxalk-language radio programming and work towards an expanded Nuxalk-English dictionary and a new online phrasebook started in 2014.

History 
Located at the mouth of the Bella Coola River, the nation was only accessible by foot, air, or boat until 1953, when a road was constructed. Nuxalk people have lived in the region for millennia. Norwegian people settled in the area in the 1890s. It is estimated the population of the Nuxalkmc people were in the thousands amongst different villages. Stories suggest there were approximately ten thousand to thirty thousand spanning the whole Bella Coola Valley and surrounding inlets.

In February 2023, a Nuxalk Nation totem pole was returned to the nation by the Royal British Columbia Museum. The totem pole was stolen from the nation in 1913 and sold to the museum for $45.

Ethnobotany 
The Nuxalk apply a poultice of pounded roots of Ranunculus acris to boils. They take a decoction of leaves Antennaria howellii for body pain, but not pain in the limbs.

A full list of their ethnobotany can be found at http://naeb.brit.org/uses/tribes/21/ (387 documented plant uses).

See also 
 Nuxálk language
 Fort McLoughlin

References

Bibliography

External links 
 Nuxalk Nation, official website
 map of Northwest Coast First Nations (including Nuxálk)
 Nuxalk artwork, collections of the National Museum of the American Indian

First Nations governments in British Columbia
 
Central Coast of British Columbia
Members of the Unrepresented Nations and Peoples Organization